The Scott O'Dell Award for Historical Fiction is an annual American children's book award that recognizes historical fiction. It was established in 1982 by Scott O'Dell, author of Island of the Blue Dolphins and 25 other children's books, in hopes of increasing young readers' interest in the history that shaped their nation and their world. Eligibility for the award requires that a book be written in English for children or young adults, published by an American publisher, and the author must be a United States citizen. The award is recognized in the United States by publishers of children's literature and young adult literature, the American Library Association, and the Assembly for Literature of Adolescents.

Selection committee
The annual selection from qualifying books is made by the O'Dell Committee. Zena Sutherland — who was Professor Emeritus of Children's Literature at the University of Chicago — headed the committee from its formation in 1982 until her death in 2002.  The committee currently consists of three people: Chairperson Roger Sutton, Editor in Chief of The Horn Book Magazine; Ann Carlson, Librarian at Oak Park and River Forest High School; and Deborah Stevenson, Editor of The Bulletin of the Center for Children's Books.

History
No award was given in 1982 and 1983, as the committee felt that "no books of sufficient merit had been published". Elizabeth George Speare was the first recipient, receiving the award for her book, The Sign of the Beaver, a tale of wilderness survival. The award has been presented every year since 1984. O'Dell himself won the award in 1987 for Streams to the River, River to the Sea, his fictional retelling of the story of Sacagawea. Louise Erdrich has won the award twice, in 2006 and in 2013.

Winners

See also
 Newbery Medal

Documents
Submission Information.
2007 Committee Press Release.

References

External links
Official site of Scott O'Dell Award for Historical Fiction
The Scott O'Dell Award

Awards established in 1982
Historical fiction awards
American children's literary awards

1982 establishments in the United States